The 1998 Hull City Council election took place on 7 May 1998 to elect members of Hull City Council in England. One third of the council was up for election and the Labour Party kept overall control of the council.

In the run up to the election there was controversy as the local Labour Party was suspended by the National Party over claims of intimidation, nepotism and membership rigging. This controversy made the Liberal Democrats confident of making gains in the election, with the results bearing this out as Labour lost 4 seats on the council.

After the election, the composition of the council was:
Labour 53
Liberal Democrat 4
Independent 2
Conservative 1

Election result

References

1998
1998 English local elections
1990s in Kingston upon Hull